Batoshevo is a village in Sevlievo Municipality Gabrovo Province, in northern central Bulgaria.

References

Villages in Gabrovo Province